The Avalanches are an Australian electronic music group formed in Melbourne in 1997. They are known for their studio albums Since I Left You (2000), Wildflower (2016), and We Will Always Love You (2020), as well as their live and recorded DJ sets. The group currently consists of Robbie Chater, Tony Di Blasi and Andy Szekeres. 

The band is a noted and important exponent of the plunderphonics genre, and their first album, Since I Left You, has been recognised by many critics as the most important example of the genre.

Career

1994–1996: Origins
Three future Avalanches members formed Alarm 115 in Melbourne in 1994 as a noise punk outfit inspired by Drive Like Jehu, The Fall, and Ultra Bide. The line-up was Robbie Chater on keyboards, Tony Di Blasi on keyboards, bass and backing vocals, and Darren Seltmann on vocals. By 1995, Manabu Etoh joined on drums. The group bought instruments, recording gear and numerous old vinyl records by the crate at second-hand shops. When Etoh was deported and Alarm 115 disbanded, these records became the core of a new project. Chater was a film student at RMIT University and had access to a recording studio, which he and Seltmann used to turn the records into a 30-song demo tape labelled Pan Amateurs. In 1997 a new group consisting of Chater, Di Blasi, Seltmann, and Gordon McQuilten on keyboards was assembled to play the tracks live. Chater, Di Blasi and McQuilten had all been school mates in Maryborough. Starting in July, their first four shows were played under different names: Swinging Monkey Cocks, Quentin's Brittle Bones, and Whoops Downs Syndrome. The group became "The Avalanches" at their fifth gig, borrowing the new band name from an American surf rock band, which recorded only one album, Ski Surfin' with the Avalanches, in 1963.

1997–1999: Early releases
After playing the support slot for Jon Spencer Blues Explosion, they rose to prominence quickly. Trifekta Records released the debut single "Rock City" in September 1997. This was followed in December by their seven-track extended play, El Producto, on Steve Pavlovic's Wondergram Records. Around this time, DJ Dexter Fabay joined the group on turntables and keyboards. Based on El Producto's success, Pavlovic signed the Avalanches to his new Modular Recordings label in May 1998. Leo Silvermann signed them to his label, Rex Records, for the exclusive United Kingdom four-track EP Undersea Community, which released in March 1999. The group's profile grew with support slots on tours by the Beastie Boys, Public Enemy, Stereolab, and Beck. The band also played at the Tibetan Freedom Concert at Sydney Olympic Park, Homebush Bay, Sydney. James Dela Cruz was added to the live line-up on turntables and keyboards, and made his debut with the band at The Palace, St Kilda, supporting Public Enemy. In September 1999 Modular Recordings issued a four-track EP Electricity in Australia (12") and a two-track UK (7") version.

2000–2004: Since I Left You

From mid-1998, the Avalanches had been recording their debut album, initially under the working title Pablo's Cruise. In February 2000 they finished mixing it at Sing Sing Studios in Melbourne. Its initial launch date in 2000 was delayed due to the need for sample clearances and overseas interest. By July, with the album, now titled Since I Left You, overdue, Chater's Gimix cassette was made available. This mixtape blended previews of forthcoming album tracks with some band favourites. Chater estimated that Since I Left You was assembled from approximately 3,500 vinyl samples. The first Australian single from the album, "Frontier Psychiatrist", was issued in August, which peaked in the top 50 on the ARIA Singles Chart. It reached No. 6 in Triple J's 2000 Hottest 100 countdown, the world's largest annual radio music poll. In October the band undertook their first Australian headline tour, appearing in all capital cities. All dates were completely sold out. Seltmann broke his leg in Brisbane in an on-stage collision with bassist and singer Di Blasi.

In November 2000, Since I Left You was launched in Melbourne with a boat cruise party aboard the Victoria Star, through Port Phillip Bay, with The Face and other UK media flying to Australia to cover the event. The band won six Australian Dance Music Awards. They travelled to the UK for a three-week promotional stint, including DJ sets at the Social and Fabric Nightclubs, while their remix of Badly Drawn Boy's "The Shining" was released in the UK. Since I Left You contained numerous samples, including a sample of Madonna's "Holiday" on the track "Stay Another Season".

The UK version of Since I Left You was released by XL Recordings in 2001, which debuted at No. 8 on the UK Albums Chart in April, and quickly topped 200,000 sales in the UK. Also that month, the first UK single from the album, the title track "Since I Left You", was released and debuted at No. 16 on the UK Singles Chart.

The "Since I Left You" video won Video of the Year at the MTV Europe Music Awards. In July 2001 the second UK single, "Frontier Psychiatrist", debuted at No. 18. The video for "Frontier Psychiatrist" was later awarded the runner-up prize at Soho Shorts Film Festival in the UK. At the ARIA Music Awards of 2001, the group won four categories, Best New Artist – Album and Best Dance Release for Since I Left You, Best New Artist – Single for "Frontier Psychiatrist", and Producer of the Year for Bobbydazzler (production name for Chater and Seltmann). They were also nominated in five additional categories, Album of the Year and Best Group for Since I Left You, Single of the Year for "Frontier Psychiatrist", Engineer of the Year by Tony Espie and Bobbydazzler and Best Cover Art by Bobbydazzler for Since I Left You.

London-Sire Records released the United States version in November 2001. When the label dissolved in 2003, the Avalanches switched to Elektra. The album was also released in Japan, with bonus track "Everyday". The At Last Alone EP (rescheduled tour EP with revised track listing) was also issued in Japan. In the United States, the album peaked at No. 31 on Billboard's Heatseekers chart and No. 10 on Billboards Top Electronic Albums chart. In the US, a promotional "Since I Left You" 12" featuring remixes from Stereolab and Prince Paul was released, and the Avalanches' remix of the Manic Street Preachers' "So Why So Sad" was issued worldwide.

Professional critics included Since I Left You on their "Best of 2000s" lists. The album was placed at No. 4 in Juice magazine's 'Best Australian albums of all time' list, and No. 10 in Pitchfork Media's top albums of the decade. In its review, Pitchfork Media bestowed the album with a high 9.5 score. In October 2010, the album was listed at No. 10 in the book 100 Best Australian Albums. In 2011, American hip hop artist Questlove named Since I Left You in his top ten albums list.

2005–2019: Wildflower

The Avalanches had been working on their second album since at least 2005. Seltmann had said the album was starting out as "ambient world music", but it was still moving in different directions and would feature both samples and live music. Chater later revealed that Seltmann had left the group by 2006, "we stopped working together... I was always making stuff and getting on with it, and the new record wasn't materialising quickly. He had a kid, a family, and I guess he realised before I did that it was going to take a long time."

Subsequent announcements were made of the album's release, however, it had not appeared by December 2011. Other artists began to announce having worked with the band on tracks around that time. In February 2014 Modular Recordings confirmed Seltmann had left, stating "officially the band is Robbie Chater and Tony Di Blasi right now." The band's official Facebook page was updated in 2015, listing James Dela Cruz had rejoined.

In April 2016 the Avalanches added new images of a gold butterfly on black cloth to their social media accounts and official website. On 24 May, the group posted a video poking fun at their long hiatus since their last album and the continued speculation of a follow-up release. On 2 June 2016 the lead single, "Frankie Sinatra", from their second album, was premiered on Australian radio station Triple J. The title of the album was revealed the same day to be Wildflower. It appeared in the following month, with Chater and Di Blasi as co-producers.

At the ARIA Music Awards of 2016 the group received six more nominations, Album of the Year, Best Dance Release and Best Group for Wildflower; Producer of the Year for Chater and Di Blasi; Engineer of the Year for Chater and Espie; and Best Cover Art for Lost Art (Chater). At Metacritic, which assigns a normalised rating out of 100 to reviews from mainstream critics, it received an average score of 83, based on 33 reviews, indicating critical acclaim. It peaked at No. 1 on the ARIA Albums Chart.

2020–present: We Will Always Love You

On 11 February 2020, the Avalanches posted a photo of a promotional billboard in Melbourne advertising a website. On the website, a video played containing several faint voices, followed by a Morse code message stating 'WWALY'. On 14 February, the website was updated with a second video containing another morse code message, this time spelling "20 FEB". Two days later on 16 February, the Avalanches posted a photo of a second billboard in London.

On 20 February 2020, the Avalanches released a single, "We Will Always Love You" featuring Blood Orange. With this release, they also confirmed their third studio album. On 18 March, they released another single, "Running Red Lights" featuring Pink Siifu and Rivers Cuomo from Weezer. The song is dedicated to David Berman and features lyrics from the Purple Mountains song "Darkness and Cold".

On 9 September, the band confirmed via an Instagram post that the title of their third album is We Will Always Love You. The album was released on 11 December 2020 and features contributions from Denzel Curry, Tricky and Jamie xx.

Live performances

The Avalanches, initially, played live using samplers, analogue keyboards, bass guitar, drum kit, and theremin. Their set-up later included four turntables, a percussion stand, and a battery of MIDI-controlled special effects.

The band performed at festivals during 2000–2001, including the Big Day Out, Falls Festival and V1. For their European live tour, Peter "Snakey" Whitford was used as a touring percussionist, he had previously played in the Afro Psych band Prophecy throughout the Indonesian islands. Seltmann broke his ankle during the band's Electric Ballroom show in London, while Dela Cruz suffered a concussion on-stage at the V2001 festival. The remaining live dates were DJ sets with Chater only. Despite this, the band eventually received the Best Live Act 2001 award from MUZIK magazine. This format continued for the United States and Japan Since I Left You Tours. Chater, Dela Cruz and Fabay also took the DJ show around Australia, calling themselves the Magic Midgets.

Brains was a monthly club-night held outdoors behind the tiny Melbourne bar St Jeromes', and featured regular DJ sets from the Avalanches' Chater, Seltmann and Di Blasi. St Jeromes' was shut down in March 2009. Their Brains' performances were usually soca-inspired DJ sets, but included anything from the Highlife guitar music of West Africa to unusual re-edits of 1980s acid house tracks, and sometimes new Avalanches material. Far from a typical world music DJ set, the Brains' nights were extremely loud and celebratory, with people overflowing into Caledonian Lane, the band bringing in a special P.A. system to cope with the extra crowd. The Brains' experience toured Australia in early 2005, and spilled over into the band's DJ sets at that year's St Jerome's Laneway Festival and Meredith Music Festival. The Avalanches continued DJing at Australian festivals such as Golden Plains and Splendour in the Grass throughout 2006 and into 2007, although these sets were a return to a heavier, club sound and markedly different from the previous Brains' DJ sets.

The group returned to live performances in 2016, with a performance at Australian music festival Splendour in the Grass. Their live setup feature Chater on bass and Di Blasi on turntables, alongside guest musicians Paris Jeffree on drums, Spank Rock as MC, and Eliza Wolfgramm on vocals.

In May 2017 The Avalanches curated The Avalanches – Since I Left You Block Party as part of Sydney's Vivid LIVE festival. Playing outdoors at the Sydney Opera House, The Avalanches headlined and were joined by 'special guests' DJ Shadow, Briggs, Sampa the Great, Jonti and DJ JNETT. While The Avalanches set was billed as "Since I Left You being performed live in full at Vivid LIVE for the first time since 2001", the show drew criticism from some fans as they mostly played tracks from Wildflower.

Members

Current
 Robbie Chater – keyboards, mixing, production, choir conductor, guitar, bass, drums (1997–present)
 Tony Di Blasi – keyboards, bass, theremin, synthesizer, backing vocals, production (1997–present)
 Andy Szekeres – keyboards, synthesizer, turntables (2019–present)

Former
Listed alphabetically:
 James Dela Cruz – turntables, keyboards (1999–2004, 2015–2016)
 Manabu Etoh – drums (1997)
 Dexter Fabay – turntables (1997–2003)
 Gordon McQuilten – keyboards, percussion, piano, drums (1997–2001)
 Darren Seltmann – keyboards, brass band leader, choir conductor, design, guitar, mixing, production (1997–2006)
 Peter "Snakey" Whitford – drums (2001–2002)

Wildflower touring members
 Spank Rock – rapping, toasting, backing vocals
 Eliza Wolfgramm – vocals, rapping
 Paris Jeffree – drums, percussion
 Oscar Vicente Slorach-Thorn – vocals
 Jonti Danilewitz – guitars, backing vocals, percussion, drums

Timeline

Discography

Studio albums
Since I Left You (2000)
Wildflower (2016)
We Will Always Love You (2020)

Awards and nominations

ARIA Music Awards
The ARIA Music Awards are annual awards, which recognise excellence, innovation, and achievement across all genres of Australian music. The Avalanches have been nominated for 15 awards and won four.

!
|-
| rowspan=9|2001 || rowspan=4|Since I Left You || Best Group ||  || style="text-align:center;" rowspan="9"|
|-
| ARIA Award for Breakthrough Artist – Album ||  
|-
| Best Dance Release ||  
|-
| Album of the Year ||  
|-
| rowspan="2"|"Frontier Psychiatrist" || ARIA Award for Breakthrough Artist – Single ||  
|-
| Single of the Year ||  
|-
| rowspan="2"|Bobbydazzler (Robbie Chater, Darren Seltmann) for Since I Left You ||  Producer of the Year ||  
|-
| Best Cover Art ||   
|-
| Tony Espie, Bobbydazzler (Chater, Seltmann) for Since I Left You || Engineer of the Year || 
|-
| rowspan="6"|2016 || rowspan="3"| Wildflower || Album of the Year ||  || style="text-align:center;" rowspan="6"|
|-
| Best Group ||  
|-
| Best Dance Release ||  
|-
| Chater, Tony Di Blasi for Wildflower || Producer of the Year ||  
|-
| Espie, Chater for Wildflower || Engineer of the Year ||  
|-
| Lost Art (Chater) for Wildflower || Best Cover Art ||  
|-
|-
| rowspan="8"| 2021||rowspan="3"| We Will Always Love You ||Album of the Year ||  
| rowspan="8"| 
|-
| Best Group ||  
|-
| Best Pop Release || 
|-
| The Avalanches Live || Best Australian Live Act || 
|-
| Johnathan Zawada for The Avalanches – "The Devine Chord" || Best Video ||  
|-
| Robert Chater for The Avalanches – We Will Always Love You || Producer of the Year ||  
|-
| Tony Espie for The Avalanches – We Will Always Love You || Engineer of the Year ||  
|-
| Jonathan Zawada for The Avalanches – We Will Always Love You || Best Cover Art ||  
|-

Australian Music Prize
The Australian Music Prize (the AMP) is an annual award of $30,000 given to an Australian band or solo artist in recognition of the merit of an album released during the year of award. They commenced in 2005.

|-
| 2016
| Wildflower
| Australian Music Prize
| 
|-
| 2020
| We Will Always Love You
| Album of the Year
| 
|}

J Award
The J Awards are an annual series of Australian music awards that were established by the Australian Broadcasting Corporation's youth-focused radio station Triple J. They commenced in 2005.

|-
| 2016
| Wildflower
| Australian Album of the Year
| 
|-
| rowspan="2"| 2021
| We Will Always Love You 
| Australian Album of the Year
| 
|-
| The Avalanches
| Double J Artist of the Year
| 
|-

Music Victoria Awards
The Music Victoria Awards, are an annual awards night celebrating Victorian music. They commenced in 2005.

! 
|-
|rowspan="5"| 2021
| We Will Always Love You
| Best Victorian Album
| 
|rowspan="3"|
|-
| "Wherever You Go"
| Best Victorian Song
| 
|-
| The Avalanches
| Best Group
| 
|-

National Live Music Awards
The National Live Music Awards (NLMAs) are a broad recognition of Australia's diverse live industry, celebrating the success of the Australian live scene. The awards commenced in 2016.

|-
| 2016
| Paris Jeffree (The Avalanches)
| Live Drummer of the Year
| 
|-

References

External links
 
 
 
 Track lists & Details for the Avalanches Mixes
 The Avalanches select their five favourite tracks to sample
 The Avalanches - The GIMIX  mixtape

ARIA Award winners
Australian electronic music groups
Musical groups established in 1997
Victoria (Australia) musical groups
MTV Europe Music Award winners